Beaverdam Creek (also spelled Beaver Dam Creek) is a stream in Pettis County in the U.S. state of Missouri. It is a tributary of the South Fork Blackwater River.

Beaverdam Creek was so named due to the presence of beaver dams in the area.

See also
List of rivers of Missouri

References

Rivers of Pettis County, Missouri
Rivers of Missouri